Nikita Maksimovich Gvineysky (born 28 December 1998) is a Russian football player.

Club career
He made his debut in the Russian Premier League for FC Tom Tomsk on 3 March 2017 in a game against FC Rostov.

References

External links
 

1998 births
People from Prokopyevsk
Living people
Russian footballers
FC Tom Tomsk players
FC Sokol Saratov players
Russian Premier League players
Association football midfielders
Sportspeople from Kemerovo Oblast